Aparna Dixit (born 20 October 1991) is an Indian television actress. She is well known for playing Poorvi in Sony Pal's Yeh Dil Sun Raha Hai, Devika in Life OK's Kalash - Ek Vishwaas, Bani in Colors TV's Bepanah Pyaar, and Shrishti in Dangal TV's Pyar Ki Luka Chuppi.

Early life 
Dixit was born on 20 October 1991 in Agra, India. She has a younger brother, Agam Dixit, who is also an actor.

Personal life
On 3 July 2022, Dixit was reported to be diagnosed with Chickenpox virus, thus she immediately stopped shooting for her ongoing series Woh Toh Hai Albelaa until her complete recovery.

Career
Dixit made her acting debut with Star Plus's mythological series Mahabharat as Queen Ambika from 2013 until 2014. She followed by acting in Zee TV's Pavitra Rishta. In 2014, Dixit portrayed Gauri in Colors TV's Meri Aashiqui Tum Se Hi. She got her first breakthrough as a lead in Sony Pal's Yeh Dil Sun Raha Hai opposite Navi Bhangu as Poorvi which went off-air in February 2015.

She followed up by playing protagonist Devika in Life OK's Kalash - Ek Vishwaas opposite Krip Suri. which started airing from 2015 until 2017. In 2016, she participated in Colors TV's Box Cricket League 2. In 2017, she entered Colors TV's Shakti - Astitva Ke Ehsaas Ki as Neeru. In 2018, she played Roxana in Sony TV's Porus.

In October 2018, she reunited with her Kalash co-actor, Krip Suri for &TV's Laal Ishq for an episodic role as Savitri. In 2019, she played the role of Bani in Bepannah Pyaar, alongside Pearl V Puri and Ishita Dutta. Her character was initially a cameo role which was extended. The show ended in February 2020. She later participated in Colors TV's reality show Khatra Khatra Khatra. In 2019, she played the lead as Shrishti in Dangal TV's Pyaar Ki Luka Chuppi opposite Rahul Sharma. The show ended in September 2020. Recently she worked in a Hindi language web series titled Exit.

From April 2022 to August 2022, she portrayed the main antagonist Anjali Malhotra in Star Bharat's Woh Toh Hai Albelaa alongside Shaheer Sheikh and Hiba Nawab.

Filmography

Television

References

External links 

 
 

Living people
1991 births
Indian television actresses